Club Atlético Ciclón, most commonly known as Ciclón de Tarija is a football club from Tarija, Bolivia currently playing in the Liga de Fútbol Profesional Boliviano (LFPB). The club was founded on September 21, 1951, and they play their home games at the Estadio IV Centenário. Ciclón competed in the LFPB from 1985 until its relegation in 1995. The team recently won the second division Nacional B championship and promotion to the LFPB for the 2015–16 season.

National honours

First Division – Professional Era: 0
Liga Nacional B: 1
2014-2015

Second Division, Copa Simón Bolivar: 1
1984

References

External links

Association football clubs established in 1951
Ciclon
1951 establishments in Bolivia
Tarija